This is a list of electoral results for the Division of Wills in Australian federal elections from the division's creation in 1949 until the present.

Members

Election results

Elections in the 2020s

2022

Elections in the 2010s

2019

2016

2013

2010

Elections in the 2000s

2007

2004

2001

Elections in the 1990s

1998

1996

The division was affected by a redistribution, however it is unclear what effect the new boundaries had on Cleary's margin. The swing compares the margin with the 1993 election without any notional adjustment.

1993

Bob Hawke had won the seat at the [[Electoral results for the Division of Wills#1990|1990 election]], however he resigned in 1992 and Phil Cleary won the seat at the resulting by-election.

1992 Wills by-election

1990

Elections in the 1980s

1987

1984

1983

1980

Elections in the 1970s

1977

1975

1974

1972

Elections in the 1960s

1969

1966

1963

1961

Elections in the 1950s

1958

1955

1954

1951

Elections in the 1940s

1949

References

 Australian Electoral Commission. Federal election results
 Carr, Adam. Psephos

Australian federal electoral results by division